Wahlenbergia insulae-howei  is a flowering plant in the bellflower family. The specific epithet alludes to Lord Howe Island, where it is found.

Description
It is a perennial herb, tufted and sparsely branched, growing to 5–15 cm in height. The linear or narrowly elliptic to elliptic-oblanceolate leaves are usually 5–20 mm long, 1–6 mm wide. It has blue, bell shaped flowers 6.5–10 mm long. The growth habit varies according to the substrate, being more stunted and tufty in exposed clefts in rocks.

Distribution and habitat
The plant is endemic to Australia’s subtropical Lord Howe Island in the Tasman Sea. It is found at rocky sites in bushy grassland.

References

insulae-howei
Endemic flora of Lord Howe Island
Plants described in 1947
Taxa named by Noel Lothian